Boltensternstraße is a station on the Cologne Stadtbahn line 18, located in the Cologne district of Nippes. The station lies on Riehler Straße, adjacent to nearby Boltensternstraße, after which the station is named.

The station was opened in 1974 and consists of two side platforms with two rail tracks.

See also 
 List of Cologne KVB stations

External links 
 station info page 

Cologne KVB stations
Nippes, Cologne
Railway stations in Germany opened in 1974